Mary Sarah Gross (born July 7, 1995), known professionally as Mary Sarah, is a country music singer and songwriter. She started what would become her career with performances local to her region, before being picked up by Kidz Bop in 2007. After leaving them, she continued with local and regional performances before releasing Crazy Good in 2010. Her second album, Bridges, followed in 2014, and included duets with several high-profile country music stars. A third album, Dress Up This Town, followed a year later, and she has performed at the Grand Ole Opry and was featured on The Voice.

Early years
Mary Sarah Gross was born in Tulsa, Oklahoma on July 7, 1995, to Richard and Patricia Gross. She has one sister, Emilee Elizabeth (b. 1993), one brother, Christopher Thomas (b. 1989), and one step brother, Richard Tyler who resides in Santa Barbara, CA, and works as a photographer. Christopher was born prematurely, received a liver transplant and is Type 1 diabetic. For this reason, she supports the Juvenile Diabetes Research Foundation (JDRF). She is also the National Ambassador for Caiden's Hope, an organization that assists with non-medical expenses related to caring for an infant in neonatal intensive care.

Singing career
Mary Sarah began performing in church at the age of 8, and began to appear on radio stations and at several regional Opry Theaters. She was signed to the Osbrink Talent Agency in Los Angeles at age 11, and in 2007, at the age of 12, toured as a featured lead vocalist and dancer in Kidz Bop for six months. At the age of 14, she left the agency and returned to Texas, where she performed in local and regional events.

In 2010 she released her first album, Crazy Good.

In January 2011, Mary Sarah was invited to meet The Oak Ridge Boys after Joe Bonsall saw a video of her performance of "Don't Stop Believing" at the Sugar Land (Texas) Idol competition. After visiting with them backstage before the show at the Galveston Grand Opera House, Joe and Duane Allen invited her onstage to sing "Where the Boys Are". She credits the support and love of The Oak Ridge Boys for helping her career move forward.

In 2011, she hosted a four-part series for the 2011 season of "OPRY on the Square – Country Now and Then" at the Sugar Land, TX, town square. In December 2011, the Houston Texans held a vote-in contest to see who would sing the National Anthem for their annual Home for the Holidays game. Mary Sarah was the winner over 7 other finalists. In April 2014, Mary Sarah appeared on the "Opry Country Classics" with Lynn Anderson and The Oakridge Boys, honoring the late Ray Price

On July 8, 2014, Mary Sarah released her second album, Bridges. Included on the album is a rendition of "Where the Boys Are" with Neil Sedaka. The Oak Ridge Boys also appear on the album singing "Dream On" with her. Several major country stars also join Mary in duet. On July 29, 2014, Mary Sarah appeared on Mike Huckabee's show on Fox News to promote her new album. The Governor played bass in accompaniment as they performed "The Fightin' Side of Me".

On May 31, 2016, Mary Sarah made her Grand Ole Opry debut.  Mary Sarah has appeared a total of 5 times since that date.

On October 31, 2017, Deadline Hollywood announced that Mary Sarah was selected to be a lead performer in The Voice: Neon Dreams.

The Voice (2016)
On February 29, 2016, Mary Sarah auditioned on season 10 of The Voice with "Where the Boys Are". All four coaches turned their chairs for her, and she chose Blake Shelton as her coach. She defeated Justin Whisnant in the battles, and defeated Brittany Kennell in the knockouts. She placed in the middle three in the semifinals and was then eliminated in the Instant Save performances, placing her in the Top Six. She lost a "twitter save" to Laith Al Saadi, the bearded blues guitarist/rocker from Ann Arbor Michigan in a sing off, exiting the show in the 5th position.

 – Studio version of performance reached the top 10 on iTunes

Discography

Albums

Singles

Further reading
 2015 Billboard Artists to Watch January 1, 2015, Chuck Dauphin
Interview With Mary Sarah All Indie Magazine, retrieved October 22, 2010
Interview with Mary Sarah Buzz Edition, retrieved December 23, 2010
 Mary Sarah to Release "Bridges," duets with Dolly, Willie, Merle, Ray Price, Staff, retrieved January 28, 2014
 615 Spotlight: Mary Sarah Builds 'Bridges' With Country Icons (Song Premiere) Retrieved September 7, 2014
Mary Sarah releases new music "Dress Up This Town"
Mary Sarah Electrifies Sand and Sage Roundup

References

External links
 AGR Television Records International Record Label of Mary Sarah (multi-lingual)
 CMT Artist Profile CMT Artist Profile
 Grand Ole Opry Artist Profile Grand Ole Opry Artist Profile

1995 births
Living people
American women country singers
American country singer-songwriters
Musicians from Tulsa, Oklahoma
The Voice (franchise) contestants
Singer-songwriters from Oklahoma
Singer-songwriters from Texas
21st-century American singers
21st-century American women singers
Country musicians from Texas
Country musicians from Oklahoma